Eupatolin is a chemical compound. It is a flavonol rhamnoside attached at the 3 position to an eupatolitin molecule. It can be found in Eupatorium ligustrinum.

References 

O-methylated flavonols
Flavonol rhamnosides
Flavonoids found in Asteraceae